Nyinba is an ethnic group of people living in the Humla District of Nepal.

The Nyinba are also the name given to a small Tibetan-speaking ethnic group living in northwest Nepal. They are known for their practice of polyandry and their strong preference of daughters, and were studied by anthropologist Nancy Levine in the 1980s.

Ethnic groups in Nepal